Pops restaurant in Arcadia, Oklahoma is a modern roadside attraction on Route 66. Using a theme of soda pop, it is marked by a giant neon sign in the shape of a soda pop bottle. The glass walls of the restaurant are decorated with shelves of soda pop bottles, arranged by beverage color. These bottles are for sale as-is, or may be purchased cold from the huge refrigerator at the western end.

Opened in 2007, the restaurant's structure incorporates a cantilevered truss extending 100 feet over the gas pumps and parking area in the forecourt.

The roadside sign is 66 feet tall and weighs 4 tons. The height is a reference to the historic highway beside which it is situated. Although apparently constructed from neon tubes, it is actually lit by LEDs, which provide a spectacular light show each night.

The establishment was owned by the late Oklahoman oil and gas magnate Aubrey McClendon and was designed by the noted architecture firm Elliott + Associates Architects.  Pops has won several architectural awards.

In 2011 two Pops gift shop locations opened in the Will Rogers World Airport in Oklahoma City. In 2016 another Pops was opened in Nichols Hills, Oklahoma incorporating the idea of the original location, but with a modern design. Although the glass walls were also decorated with shelves of bottles, arranged by color, bottles were only for sale from the refrigerator. Unlike the first location, this location also featured a wide variety of candy and sweets. The Nichols Hills location closed in December 2018.

Gallery

References

External links
 

Tourist attractions along U.S. Route 66
U.S. Route 66 in Oklahoma
Restaurants in Oklahoma
Roadside attractions in Oklahoma
2007 establishments in Oklahoma
Tourist attractions in Oklahoma County, Oklahoma
Buildings and structures in Oklahoma County, Oklahoma
Commercial buildings completed in 2007